Bill McDonald may refer to:

Bill McDonald (actor) in Ollie Hopnoodle's Haven of Bliss and A History of Violence
Bill McDonald (American journalist), American journalist and editor for The New York Times
Bill McDonald (Australian journalist) (born 1967), Australian journalist and news presenter
Bill McDonald (basketball) (1916–1994), American professional basketball player
Bill McDonald (Texas Ranger) (1852–1918), Texas Ranger and bodyguard for both U.S. Presidents Theodore Roosevelt and Woodrow Wilson

See also 
William Macdonald (disambiguation)
Bill MacDonald (disambiguation)
Bill Macdonald, sportscaster
Bill Macdonald (baseball) (1929–1991), American professional baseball player